Yanqing may refer to:

Yanqing District (formerly Yanqing County), in Beijing, China
Yanqing (town), a subdivision of Yanqing District
Jiuxian, a main settlement of Yanqing County until 1316
Yanqing Temple, near Wutaishan, Shanxi province
Yan Qing, a fictional character in Water Margin

See also

 
 
 Yanjin (disambiguation)
 Yanjing (disambiguation)
 Qingyan (disambiguation), including Qing Yan
 Qing (disambiguation)
 Yan (disambiguation)